The Specialist Crime Directorate (SCD) was one of the main branches of London's Metropolitan Police Service. It provided highly visible specialist policing services across the whole of London. Assistant Commissioner Mark Rowley had previously led the directorate but it was later led by Assistant Commissioner Cressida Dick. The Directorate led national police agency with regard to specialist crime investigations such as e-crime, sex crimes (paedophile unit) or kidnappings, hostage-taking and contract killings.

The Specialist Crime Directorate was merged with Central Operations to create Specialist Crime & Operations, which was itself later split, with Operations now in Met Operations and Specialist Crime part of Frontline Policing Headquarters within Frontline Policing.

It encompassed several departments:

 Air Support Unit
 Child Abuse Investigation Command
 Computer Crime and Cybercrime
 Covert Policing
 Crime Academy
 Dog support unit
 Emergency Preparedness
 Film Unit
 Fingerprint Services
 Forensic Services
 Homicide and Serious Crime
 Human Exploitation
 Marine Policing
 Met Intelligence Bureau
 Mounted Branch
 Overseas Visitors Registration
 Rape & Serious Sexual Assault
 Serious and Organised Crime
 Specialist & Economic Crime
 Territorial Support Group
 Traffic Criminal Justice Unit
 Traffic Operational Command
 Trident Gang Crime Command

References

External links
 

Metropolitan Police units